John Proctor (born November 2, 1950) is an American bobsledder. He competed in the two man and the four man events at the 1976 Winter Olympics.

References

1950 births
Living people
American male bobsledders
Olympic bobsledders of the United States
Bobsledders at the 1976 Winter Olympics
People from Plattsburgh, New York
20th-century American people